In Belgium, open access to scholarly communication accelerated after 2007 when the University of Liège adopted its first open-access mandate. The "Brussels Declaration" for open access was signed by officials in 2012.

The presence of many Belgium research organizations to the Berlin Declaration on Open access, and the creation of Immediate Deposit and Optional Access mandate at ULG in 2007, led to the Brussels Declaration on Open Access signed in 2012 by the Minister of research. This Declaration enabled Belgium to have a broad network of institutional open-access repositories by circulating the results to Belgian academic and scientific research.

Repositories 
There are some 23 collections of scholarship in Belgium housed in digital open access repositories. They contain journal articles, book chapters, data, and other research outputs that are  free to read. The Université catholique de Louvain, Ghent University's "Academic Bibliography", and University of Liège's "Orbi" hold many publications.

BELSPO open research data mandate 
The BELSPO (Belgian Federal Science Policy Office) mandate was introduced on 21 November 2019. The policy aims at complying with the FAIR data principles in a more sustainable manner, and is applicable to digital data whose collection has been funded either partially or entirely by the BELSPO. The Data management plan (DMP) was to be integrated in March 2020.

See also

 Internet in Belgium
 Education in Belgium
 Media of Belgium
 List of libraries in Belgium
 Science and technology in Belgium
 Open access in other countries

References

Further reading

External links
 . (Overview guide)
 Links to resources by subject: architecture, astronomy, biology, chemistry, economics, engineering, humanities, informatics, information technology, law, medicine, pharmacy, physics, political science, psychology, social sciences.
 Belgian Open Access Bibliography
 
 
 
 
 
 
 Open Knowledge Belgium (videos).

Academia in Belgium
Communications in Belgium
Belgium
Publishing in Belgium
Science and technology in Belgium